Burt Van Horn (October 28, 1823 – April 1, 1896) was a United States representative from New York during the American Civil War.  He served New York's 31st District from 1861 to 1863, and the 29th District from 1865 to 1869.  He was a staunch supporter of President Abraham Lincoln and the Union.

Biography
Born in Newfane, New York, on October 28, 1823, to James Augustus Van Horn and Abigail Van Horn (née Carpenter).  He attended the common schools, Yates Academy in Orleans County, and Hamilton Literary and Theological Institution (predecessor of Colgate University) in Hamilton. He engaged in agricultural pursuits in Niagara County and later in the manufacture of cloth.

Van Horn was a member of the New York State Assembly from 1858 to 1860. On January 15, 1860, standing before the Assembly, Burt delivered the speech, "Liberty and The Union".

Van Horn was elected as a Republican to the Thirty-seventh Congress, holding office from March 4, 1861, to March 3, 1863. He was elected to the Thirty-ninth and Fortieth Congresses, holding office from March 4, 1865, to March 3, 1869; he was not a candidate for renomination in 1868.

On March 31, 1868, Van Horn testified in the impeachment trial of President Andrew Johnson, having been called as a witness by the prosecution.

Van Horn moved to Lockport in 1867, where he engaged in the family farming and textile businesses. He was also involved with community banking, specifically making loans. He was a collector of internal revenue at Rochester from 1877 to 1882. He died in 1896 in Lockport, NY and is interred at Glenwood Cemetery.

Personal life

References

 Retrieved on 2009-03-26

External links

1823 births
1896 deaths
American people of Dutch descent
Politicians from Lockport, New York
Republican Party members of the New York State Assembly
People of New York (state) in the American Civil War
Republican Party members of the United States House of Representatives from New York (state)
19th-century American politicians
Testifying witnesses of the impeachment trial of Andrew Johnson